Željko Buvač (born 13 September 1961) is a Bosnian football manager and former professional player who works as a sporting director for Russian Premier League club FC Dynamo Moscow. He is the former assistant manager of Premier League club Liverpool, a role he took in 2015 but left in April 2018.

Current Liverpool manager Jurgen Klopp labelled Buvač as "the brain" in his coaching team, while describing himself as "the heart" and the second assistant coach, Peter Krawietz, as "the eye".

He has been credited with developing the high-speed attacking style that brought success at Borussia Dortmund.

Playing career

Club
Buvač was born in Omarska, SR Bosnia and Herzegovina within Yugoslavia to ethnic Serb parents. He played for FK Borac Banja Luka in the Yugoslav First League. While playing for Borac, in 1988, he won the Yugoslav Cup.

In 1991, he moved to Germany and played with FC Rot-Weiß Erfurt and 1. FSV Mainz 05 in the 2. Bundesliga. From 1995 to 1998, Buvač played for SC Neukirchen, where he ended his playing career in 1998 at the age of 37.

Managerial career
After retiring, Buvač became a manager. He finished his playing career with SC Neukirchen in 1998, and he took charge of the club soon after hanging up his boots. In 2001, after three seasons at Neukirchen, he became assistant manager of another of his former clubs, 1. FSV Mainz 05, where he joined friend, former teammate, and Mainz manager Jürgen Klopp. During his seven years at the club they achieved promotion to the Bundesliga, and later earned European qualification.

In 2008, he moved with Klopp to become assistant manager at Borussia Dortmund. Described by Klopp as his "right hand", Buvač helped lead Dortmund to back-to-back Bundesliga wins in 2011 and 2012, as well as the DFB-Pokal in 2012, the DFL-Supercup in 2008, 2013 and 2014, and their second appearance in a Champions League final in 2013. In 2013, while still at Dortmund, Buvač also became the head coach of the Republika Srpska official football team.

In October 2015, he joined newly appointed manager Klopp and took up the role of assistant manager at Premier League club Liverpool.

On 30 April 2018, Liverpool announced that Buvač was to take a leave of absence for the rest of the 2017–18 season due to personal reasons. It was later announced that he had left the club permanently.

On 1 February 2020, he was appointed sporting director by the Russian club FC Dynamo Moscow. On 14 December 2021, he extended his contract with Dynamo until the summer of 2024.

Managerial Statistics

Honours

Player
Borac Banja Luka
Yugoslav Cup: 1987–88

Manager

As assistant manager
Mainz 05
2. Bundesliga promotion: 2003–04

Borussia Dortmund
Bundesliga: 2010–11, 2011–12
DFB-Pokal: 2011–12
DFL-Supercup: 2013, 2014
UEFA Champions League runner-up: 2012–13

Liverpool
Football League Cup runner-up: 2015–16
UEFA Champions League runner-up: 2017–18
UEFA Europa League runner-up: 2015–16

References

External links
Željko Buvač at Soccerway

1961 births
Living people
People from Prijedor
Serbs of Bosnia and Herzegovina
Association football midfielders
Yugoslav footballers
Bosnia and Herzegovina footballers
FK Rudar Prijedor players
FK Borac Banja Luka players
1. FSV Mainz 05 players
FC Rot-Weiß Erfurt players
Yugoslav First League players
2. Bundesliga players
Regionalliga players
Yugoslav expatriate footballers
Bosnia and Herzegovina expatriate footballers
Expatriate footballers in Germany
Yugoslav expatriate sportspeople in Germany
Bosnia and Herzegovina expatriate sportspeople in Germany
Bosnia and Herzegovina football managers
Expatriate football managers in Germany
1. FSV Mainz 05 non-playing staff
Borussia Dortmund non-playing staff
Liverpool F.C. non-playing staff
Bosnia and Herzegovina expatriate sportspeople in England
Bosnia and Herzegovina expatriate sportspeople in Russia